The 2012 Cross River State gubernatorial election occurred in Nigeria on February 25, 2012. The PDP nominee Liyel Imoke won the election, defeating Usani Uguru Usani of the ACN.

Liyel Imoke emerged as PDP candidate. He picked Efiok Cobham as his running mate. Usani Uguru Usani was the ACN candidate.

Electoral system
The Governor of Cross River State is elected using the plurality voting system.

Primary election

PDP primary
The PDP primary election was held on January 23, 2012. Liyel Imoke emerged PDP flag bearer after polling 737 votes and defeating his closest rival, former Nigerian Ambassador to Mali and former PDP state chairman, Soni Abang who scored 3. He picked Efiok Cobham as his running mate.

ACN primary
The ACN primary election was held on February 6, 2012. Usani Uguru Usani emerged the party's flag bearer after defeating his closest rival, Mike Ogar.

Results

References 

Cross River State gubernatorial elections
Cross River State gubernatorial election
Cross River State gubernatorial election
Cross River State gubernatorial election